Condé Nast Entertainment (also known as CNE) is a production and distribution studio with film, television, social and online video, and virtual reality content.

CNE is headquartered at 1 World Trade Center.

Background 
Previously, Condé Nast (CN) magazines were represented in Hollywood by agents and received production credit and fees for films made on their work. Brokeback Mountain, A Beautiful Mind, and Eat, Pray, Love, based on an Allure article, were all movies based on CN content. Also, the "Whale War" show on Animal Planet originated with a Condé Nast magazine article. On the other hand, Conde Nast's Vogue refused in 2003 to partner on Project Runway for fear of tarnishing its image.   With print growth slowing, CN indicated that the company would seek other revenue in licensing, e-commerce, video, and higher circulation prices.

History 

Conde Nast Entertainment was started by magazine publisher Condé Nast in October 2011 with the hiring of Dawn Ostroff.

Online video channels for GQ and Glamour were launched in March 2013 with four original video series for each brand with Procter & Gamble, Microsoft and snack-food company Mondelēz International sponsoring those shows.  Each series would have some episodes available at launch then additional episodes would be added weekly. The episodes would last from two to seven minutes and be featured on the magazines' websites and YouTube. On May 1, CNE announced at the 2nd annual Digital Content NewFronts event, an adverting selling event, two new channels for Vogue and Wired for its digital network and 30 new programs. Also, CNE agreed to syndicate their content with AOL, Yahoo, Twitter, Dailymotion, and Grab Media. Production firms Radical Media, Hud:sun Media and Magical Elves agreed to co-produce the programs. CNE's two existing channels were slated for three additional programs each. Additional channels were expected to be launched later in the year: Vanity Fair, Teen Vogue, Epicurious and Style.com.

CNE's first scripted series, Codefellas, was launched on its Wired channel. The 12 episode short-form animated series is a comedy featuring National Security Agency agents as "literally cartoonish figures engaged in ludicrous acts of domestic spying."

In July 2013, CNE made two deals: one with Discovery Communications for a Vanity Fair Confidential crime and mystery documentary series to air on Investigation Discovery channel, and the other with Ovation cable network for the Fashion Fund design contest show, a show already being shown online.

The Vanity Fair channel launched four series with ad sponsors, who were American Express, luxury brand Salvatore Ferragamo and Acura. The channel was launched in July 2013 with four programs: Vanity Code, @VFHollywood with Krista Smith, The Snob's Dictionary, and Eminent Domains.

In early April 2014, CNE launched another digital channel based on Allure. On April 29, the company announced the launch of "The Scene", a new online video platform for digital-first content, to be launched in July 2014 with content partners including ABC News, BuzzFeed, Major League Soccer, and the Weather Channel. CNE channels to be featured on The Scene would be those of The New Yorker, Lucky and Bon Appetit.

CNE agreed to its initial first-look deal in June 2014 with 20th Century Fox Television (2CFT) for its scripted television projects while 2CFT's cable arm, Fox21, would work with them for cable projects. In November 2014, the company began its move to One World Trade Center from 4 Times Square.

In January 2017, Vanity Fair'''s Hive business news and Condé Nast Entertainment partnered with Cheddar to create a live weekly series called VF Hive on Cheddar.  Graydon Carter, a Vanity Fair'' editor, called the series a "representation of how people are consuming more voraciously than ever."

At the company's fifth annual Digital Content NewFronts presentation in New York in May 2017, CNE announced the return of 65 original short-form digital series and the premiere of 40 new shows. In August 2017, CNE announced its participation in Facebook's new original video programing platform, Watch, by introducing "Virtually Dating," a show where blind dates take place in a virtual reality world. Ostroff identifies Facebook Watch as "a new opportunity, new type of content."

In December 2017, CNE announced a new first-look deal that gives Paramount and Anonymous Content an opportunity to partner with CNE on production for scripted TV projects in advance of other potential collaborators.

On February 22, 2018, Condé Nast announced the launch of Iris, a video and social-led brand for socially-conscious millennial women, that was developed from the original programming on The Scene. Programming on Iris will include the series “ Broken,” showcasing couples confronting each other about infidelity, and “Affirmations", featuring children receiving affirmations from their parents.

In July 2018, Dawn Ostroff stepped down as President to join Spotify, and COO Sahar Elhabashi was appointed interim head.

In November 2018, Oren Katzeff joined as President.

CNE employees unionized in 2022.

Video series

Television series

Filmography

Acquisitions

Incubators 
CNE is a production and distribution partner of three incubators.

"The Big Script" incubator was formed by "Hunger Games" star Josh Hutcherson and it produced five short films from young filmmakers via Black List submitted scripts. It is in partnership with Indigenous Media and The Scene houses the five "The Big Script" episodes.

CNE and Indigenous Media also produced "Project: HER," a mentoring initiative for female writers and directors. The incubator officially launched on March 28, 2018 and showcased 6 films by diverse female filmmakers mentored by “Homeland” director Lesli Linka Glatter, “The Affair” showrunner Sarah Treem, “Eves Bayou” director Kasi Lemmons, “Private Parts” director Betty Thomas and Indigenous Media co-founder Rodrigo Garcia. The films are housed on CNE's The Scene and d the Project HER Facebook show page.

"Creators in Residence" is a program designed to support millennial filmmakers.

Awards 
CNE has won several awards. The company received an Academy Award® nomination for the short documentary "Joe's Violin," as well as nominations for a Critics' Choice Award and a Peabody Award in the Documentary category for the Netflix series "Last Chance U." In 2018, CNE also received 3 News & Documentary Emmy nominations for Glamour’s “Angelique” and The New Yorker’s “The Black Athlete in America” with The RetroReport and “We Are Witnesses” with The Marshall Project.

Previously, CNE won a BAFTA for Live Action Short for "Boogaloo and Graham," an Emmy for Glamour's "Screw Cancer," and a Producers Guild Award for Outstanding Digital Series for Wired's "What's Inside."

References

External links 
Conde Nast Entertainment
 - CNE's digital platform

2011 establishments in New York City
Condé Nast